Events from the year 1706 in Ireland.

Incumbent
Monarch: Anne

Events
November 21 – the Cox Baronetcy, of Dunmanway in the County of Cork, is created in the Baronetage of Ireland in favour of Richard Cox, Lord Chancellor of Ireland.
Ulster Scots clergyman Francis Makemie organizes the first presbytery in British America.
John O'Heyne's Epilogus chronologicus exponens (a history of the Dominican Order in Ireland) is published in Louvain.

Arts and literature
 April 8 – George Farquhar's Restoration comedy The Recruiting Officer first performed at the Theatre Royal, Drury Lane, in London.

Births
 John FitzGerald, politician and hereditary Knight of Kerry (d. 1741)
 approx. date – Matthew Deane, politician (d. 1751)

Deaths
 April 10 – Arthur Chichester, 3rd Earl of Donegall, soldier (b. 1666) (killed in action)
 John Hayes, Member of Parliament for Doneraile
 Ambrose Aungier, 2nd and last Earl of Longford of the First Creation

References

 
Years of the 18th century in Ireland
Ireland
1700s in Ireland